Codex Guelferbytanus may refer to:

Codex Guelferbytanus A
Codex Guelferbytanus B
Codex Guelferbytanus 64 Weissenburgensis, which contains in the lower text of the palimpsests: Codex Guelferbytanus A, Codex Guelferbytanus B, and Codex Carolinus.

Herzog August Library